EMILY's List Australia is a political network in Australia that supports progressive Labor Party (ALP) women candidates seeking election to political office. EMILY's List Australia was inspired by EMILY's List, a Political Action Committee with similar goals in the United States. Issues central to the organisation's support of candidates are the principles of equity, diversity, reproductive rights, and the provision of equal pay and childcare.

Over 284 EMILY's List members have been elected to state and federal Australian Parliaments. The organisation was founded in 1996 and supports candidates through directed donations, "Early Money" financial support, gender gap research and volunteer support.

History
On 26 November 1994, at Fire with Fire: The Feminist Forum held at the Sydney Town Hall, Joan Kirner mentioned the plan currently before the ALP National Executive to introduce an Australian version of the US Emily's List.

In 1994, the ALP National Conference passed an Affirmative Action Rule requiring that women be pre-selected in 35 per cent of winnable seats, in all elections, by 2002. This was at the same time as passing of the Affirmative Action (Equal Employment Opportunity for Women) Act 1986.  In 1995 the ALP decided to form an internal version of EMILY's List, and in 1996 Kirner established EMILY's List Australia outside the party. with the aim of attaining 45% female membership in both the House of Representatives and the Senate.

The name EMILY comes from its United States equivalent and is an acronym for "Early Money Is Like Yeast" from the political saying, "Early money is like yeast, because it helps to raise the dough".

In the 2004 Federal Election campaign EMILY's List donated a total of $100,000 to candidates.  Research conducted by EMILY's List and submitted to the Labor Party's national executive stated that Labor women regarded then health spokeswoman Julia Gillard as the best performer during the campaign, with then Prime Minister John Howard in second place.  Of Mark Latham their submission stated; "the most common themes were: perceived aggression, concern he had been watered down for the campaign, inexperience, constantly going on about background, glib answers, bully boy tactics of the past."

In the 2010 Federal Election campaign EMILY's List undertook Gender Gap research in six key marginal seats and undertook a targeted campaign incorporating materials along the themes of 'We Can't Trust Tony', 'Let's Make History' and 'Torpedo the Speedo'.

In the 2012 Australian Capital Territory and Northern Territory elections, for the first time EMILY's List endorsed every female Labor Party candidate contesting those elections.

Australia's first female Prime Minister, Julia Gillard, was a founding member of EMILY's List Australia and assisted to prepare their initial constitution.  She presented the Inaugural EMILY's List Oration at Parliament House, Canberra in September 2011.

Organisational structure
EMILY's List Australia is run by a National Committee which includes parliamentarians, volunteers and women unionists. Although it is a partisan organisation, is not controlled by the formal structures of the ALP. At the State and Territory level there are "Action Groups" (ELAG) which have their own organisational structures. Sharon Claydon, Member of the Australian House of Representatives and Leigh Svendsen are currently the National Co-convenors.

See also
 Women and government in Australia
 Women in the Australian House of Representatives
 Women in the Australian Senate

References

External links
EMILY'S List Australia

Political advocacy groups in Australia
1996 establishments in Australia
Abortion-rights organisations in Australia
Abortion in Australia
Feminist organisations in Australia
Women's organisations based in Australia